The Port of Avilés is a port facility in the town of Avilés in Asturias, Spain. It handles bulk, breakbulk, liquid bulk and has facilities for fishing and leisure craft.

References

External links

 
 
 
 
Avilés 
Buildings and structures in Asturias 
Transport in Asturias